Tappeh Lori (also Romanized as Tappeh Lorī) is a village in Hasanabad Rural District, in the Central District of Ravansar County, Kermanshah Province, Iran. At the 2006 census, its population was 272, in 57 families.

References 

Populated places in Ravansar County